Saipan Southern High School (SSHS) is a senior high school in Koblerville, Saipan, Northern Mariana Islands. It is a part of the CNMI Public School System.

It opened in fall 2002.

References

External links
 
 

Public high schools in the United States
High schools in the Northern Mariana Islands
Educational institutions established in 2002
2002 establishments in the Northern Mariana Islands